Tachina canariensis is a species of fly in the genus Tachina of the family Tachinidae that is endemic to Canary Islands. They are blackish-brown coloured.

References

External links
Tachina canariensis image on Biolib.cz

Insects described in 1859
Endemic fauna of the Canary Islands
canariensis
Taxa named by Pierre-Justin-Marie Macquart